A King Reluctant is a 1952 historical adventure novel by the British writer Vaughan Wilkins. The plot revolves around the idea that the young Louis XVII, successor to his executed father, survived the French Revolution and turns up at Tenby on the Welsh coast.

Film adaptation
In 1957 it was adapted into the film Dangerous Exile directed by Brian Desmond Hurst and starring Louis Jourdan, Keith Michell and Belinda Lee.

References

Bibliography
 Goble, Alan. The Complete Index to Literary Sources in Film. Walter de Gruyter, 1999.

1952 British novels
Novels by Vaughan Wilkins
British historical novels
Novels set in Wales
Novels set in the 18th century
Jonathan Cape books
British novels adapted into films